WoLLIC, the Workshop on Logic, Language, Information and Computation is an academic conference in the field of pure and applied logic and theoretical computer science. WoLLIC has been organised annually since 1994, typically in June or July; the conference is scientifically sponsored by the Association for Logic, Language and Information, the Association for Symbolic Logic, the European Association for Theoretical Computer Science and the European Association for Computer Science Logic.

Ranking 

According to Computer Science Conference Ranking 2010, the conference is ranked "B" among over 1900 international conferences across the world. It is also ranked "B" on The CORE Conference Ranking Exercise - CORE Portal (2021). It is currently ranked 9th (Last 5 years), Field-Rating 1, Algorithms & Theory, at Microsoft Academic Search - Conferences. On Google Scholar, the conference gets a score of 11 as its h5-index, and a score of 16 as its h5-median.

History 
 1994: Recife, Brazil
 1995: Recife, Brazil
 1996: Salvador, Brazil
 1997: Fortaleza, Brazil
 1998: São Paulo, Brazil
 1999: Itatiaia, Brazil
 2000: Natal, Brazil
 2001: Brasilia, Brazil
 2002: Rio de Janeiro, Brazil
 2003: Ouro Preto, Brazil
 2004: Fontainebleau, France
 2005: Florianópolis, Brazil
 2006: Stanford, United States
 2007: Rio de Janeiro, Brazil
 2008: Edinburgh, United Kingdom
 2009: Tokyo, Japan
 2010: Brasilia, Brazil
 2011: Philadelphia, United States
 2012: Buenos Aires, Argentina
 2013: Darmstadt, Germany
 2014: Valparaiso, Chile 
 2015: Bloomington, Indiana, United States
 2016: Puebla, Mexico
 2017: London, United Kingdom
 2018: Bogotá, Colombia
 2019: Utrecht, The Netherlands
 2020: Lima, Peru (cancelled)
 2021: Online
 2022: Iași, România

Future Venues 
The meetings alternate between Latin America and US/Europe/Asia. The following locations are planned for future meetings:

 2023: Halifax, Nova Scotia, Canada
 2024: Bern, Switzerland

Proceedings 
 Logic, Language, Information and Computation - 28th International Workshop, WoLLIC 2022, Agata Ciabattoni, Elaine Pimentel & Ruy de Queiroz (eds.), Iaşi, Romania, September 20–23, 2022. Lecture Notes in Computer Science, Springer Berlin / Heidelberg,  (Print)  (Online), Volume 13468/2022, .
 Logic, Language, Information and Computation - 27th International Workshop, WoLLIC 2021, Alexandra Silva, Renata Wassermann & Ruy de Queiroz (eds.), Virtual Event, October 5–8, 2021. Lecture Notes in Computer Science, Springer Berlin / Heidelberg,  (Print)  (Online), Volume 13038/2021, .
 Logic, Language, Information and Computation - 26th International Workshop, WoLLIC 2019, Rosalie Iemhoff, Michael Moortgat & Ruy de Queiroz (eds.), Utrecht, The Netherlands, July 2–5, 2019. Lecture Notes in Computer Science, Springer Berlin / Heidelberg,  (Print)  (Online), Volume 11541/2019, .
 Logic, Language, Information and Computation - 25th International Workshop, WoLLIC 2018, Lawrence S. Moss, Ruy de Queiroz & Maricarmen Martínez  (eds.), Bogotá, Colombia, July 24–27, 2018. Lecture Notes in Computer Science, Springer Berlin / Heidelberg,  (Print)  (Online), Volume 10944/2018, .
 Logic, Language, Information and Computation - 24th International Workshop, WoLLIC 2017, Juliette Kennedy & Ruy de Queiroz  (eds.), London, UK, July 18–21, 2017. Lecture Notes in Computer Science, Springer Berlin / Heidelberg,  (Print)  (Online), Volume 10388/2017, .
 Logic, Language, Information and Computation - 23rd International Workshop, WoLLIC 2016, Jouko Väänänen,  Åsa Hirvonen & Ruy de Queiroz  (eds.), Puebla, Mexico, August 16–19, 2016. Lecture Notes in Computer Science, Springer Berlin / Heidelberg,  (Print)  (Online), Volume 9803/2016, .
 Logic, Language, Information and Computation - 22nd International Workshop, WoLLIC 2015, Valeria de Paiva, Ruy de Queiroz, Lawrence Moss, Daniel Leivant & Anjolina de Oliveira  (eds.), Bloomington, Indiana, USA, July 20–23, 2015. Lecture Notes in Computer Science, Springer Berlin / Heidelberg,  (Print)  (Online), Volume 9160/2015, .
 Logic, Language, Information and Computation - 21st International Workshop, WoLLIC 2014, Ulrich Kohlenbach, Pablo Barceló & Ruy de Queiroz (eds.), Valparaíso, Chile, September 1–4, 2014. Lecture Notes in Computer Science, Springer Berlin / Heidelberg,  (Print)  (Online), Volume 8652/2014, .
 Logic, Language, Information and Computation - 20th International Workshop, WoLLIC 2013, Leonid Libkin, Ulrich Kohlenbach & Ruy de Queiroz (eds.), Darmstadt, Germany, August 20–23, 2013. Lecture Notes in Computer Science, Springer Berlin / Heidelberg,  (Print)  (Online), Volume 8071/2013, .
 Logic, Language, Information and Computation - 19th International Workshop, WoLLIC 2012, Luke Ong & Ruy de Queiroz (eds.), Buenos Aires, Argentina, September 3–6, 2012. Lecture Notes in Computer Science, Springer Berlin / Heidelberg,  (Print)  (Online), Volume 7456/2012, .
 Logic, Language, Information and Computation - 18th International Workshop, WoLLIC 2011, Lev D. Beklemishev & Ruy de Queiroz (eds.), Philadelphia, PA, USA, May 18–20, 2011. Lecture Notes in Computer Science, Springer Berlin / Heidelberg,  (Print)  (Online), Volume 6642/2011, .
 Logic, Language, Information and Computation - 17th International Workshop, WoLLIC 2010, A. Dawar & R. de Queiroz (eds.), Brasília, Brazil, July 6–9, 2010. Lecture Notes in Computer Science, Springer Berlin / Heidelberg,  (Print)  (Online), Volume 6188/2010, .
 Logic, Language, Information and Computation - 16th International Workshop, WoLLIC 2009, H. Ono, M. Kanazawa & R. de Queiroz (eds.), Tokyo, Japan, June 21–24, 2009. Lecture Notes in Computer Science, Springer Berlin / Heidelberg,  (Print)  (Online), Volume 5514/2009, .
 Logic, Language, Information and Computation - 15th International Workshop, WoLLIC 2008, W. Hodges & R. de Queiroz (eds.), Edinburgh, UK, July 1–4, 2008. Lecture Notes in Computer Science, Springer Berlin / Heidelberg,  (Print)  (Online), Volume 5110/2008, .
 Logic, Language, Information and Computation - 14th International Workshop, WoLLIC 2007, D. Leivant & R. de Queiroz (eds.), Rio de Janeiro, Brazil, July 2–5, 2007. Lecture Notes in Computer Science, Springer Berlin / Heidelberg,  (Print)  (Online), Volume 4576/2007, .
 Proceedings of the 13th Workshop on Logic, Language, Information and Computation (WoLLIC 2006), Logic, Language, Information and Computation 2006. Stanford University, CA, USA. 18–21 July 2006. Edited by G. Mints and R. de Queiroz. Electronic Notes in Theoretical Computer Science. . Volume 165, Pages 1–226 (22 November 2006). (Preface )
 Proceedings of the 12th Workshop on Logic, Language, Information and Computation (WoLLIC 2005). Florianópolis, Santa Catarina, Brazil. 19–22 July 2005. Edited by R. de Queiroz, A. Macintyre and G. Bittencourt. Electronic Notes in Theoretical Computer Science. . Volume 143, Pages 1–222 (6 January 2006). (Preface )
 Proceedings of the 11th Workshop on Logic, Language, Information and Computation (WoLLIC 2004). Fontainebleau (Paris), France. 19–22 July 2004. Edited by R. de Queiroz and P. Cégielski. Electronic Notes in Theoretical Computer Science. . Volume 123, Pages 1–240 (1 March 2005). (Preface )
 WoLLIC'2003, 10th Workshop on Logic, Language, Information and Computation. Ouro Preto (Minas Gerais), Brazil. 29 July to 1 August 2003. Edited by R. de Queiroz, E. Pimentel and L. Figueiredo. Electronic Notes in Theoretical Computer Science. . Volume 84, Pages 1–231 (September 2003). (Preface )
 WoLLIC'2002, 9th Workhop on Logic, Language, Information and Computation. Rio de Janeiro, Brazil. 30 July to 2 August 2002. Edited by Ruy de Queiroz, Luiz Carlos Pereira, Edward Hermann Haeusler. Electronic Notes in Theoretical Computer Science. . Volume 67, Pages 1–314 (October 2002). (Preface )

Special Issues of Scientific Journals 

 Journal of Logic, Language and Information, 25th Workshop on Logic, Language, Information and Computation (WoLLIC 2018). Edited by Lawrence Moss & Ruy de Queiroz. Volume 31, Issue 4, December 2022, Springer.
 Information and Computation, 26th Workshop on Logic, Language, Information and Computation (WoLLIC 2019). Edited by Ruy de Queiroz. Volume 287 (September 2022), Elsevier.
 Archive for Mathematical Logic, 24th Workshop on Logic, Language, Information and Computation (WoLLIC 2017). Edited by Juliette Kennedy and Ruy de Queiroz.  Volume 60, Issue 5, Pages 525-681 (July 2021), Springer.
 Annals of Pure and Applied Logic, 23rd Workshop on Logic, Language, Information and Computation (WoLLIC 2016). Edited by Jouko Väänänen and Ruy de Queiroz.  Volume 170, Issue 9, Pages 921-1150 (September 2019), Elsevier.
 Mathematical Structures in Computer Science, 22nd Workshop on Logic, Language, Information and Computation (WoLLIC 2015). Edited by Valeria de Paiva and Ruy de Queiroz. Volume 29, Issue 6, June 2019, Cambridge University Press.
 Information and Computation, 21st Workshop on Logic, Language, Information and Computation (WoLLIC 2014). Edited by Ulrich Kohlenbach, Pablo Barcelò and Ruy de Queiroz. Volume 255, Part 2, Pages 193–334 (August 2017).
 Journal of Computer and System Sciences, 20th Workshop on Logic, Language, Information and Computation (WoLLIC 2013). Edited by Leonid Libkin, Ulrich Kohlenbach and Ruy de Queiroz. Volume 88, Pages 1–290 (September 2017).
 Theoretical Computer Science, Logic, Language, Information and Computation, 19th Workshop on Logic, Language, Information and Computation. Buenos Aires, Argentina. 3–6 September 2012. Edited by Luke Ong and Ruy de Queiroz. Volume 603, Pages 1–146 (25 October 2015).
 Journal of Computer and System Sciences, 18th Workshop on Logic, Language, Information and Computation (WoLLIC 2011). Edited by Lev Beklemishev, Ruy de Queiroz and Andre Scedrov. Volume 80, Issue 6, Pages 1037-1174 (September 2014).
 Journal of Computer and System Sciences, 17th Workshop on Logic, Language, Information and Computation (WoLLIC 2010). Edited by Anuj Dawar and Ruy de Queiroz. Volume 80, Issue 2, Pages 321-498 (March 2014).
 Fundamenta Informaticae, Logic, Language, Information and Computation. Edited by Hiroakira Ono, Makoto Kanazawa and Ruy de Queiroz. Volume 106, Numbers 2-4, Pages 119-338, September 2011.
 Journal of Computer and System Sciences, Workshop on Logic, Language, Information and Computation (WoLLIC 2008). Edited by Wilfrid Hodges and Ruy de Queiroz. Volume 76, Issue 5, Pages 281-388 (August 2010).
 Information and Computation, Special issue: 14th Workshop on Logic, Language, Information and Computation (WoLLIC 2007). Edited by Daniel Leivant and Ruy de Queiroz. Volume 208, Issue 5, Pages 395-604, (May 2010).
 Information and Computation, Special issue: 13th Workshop on Logic, Language, Information and Computation (WoLLIC 2006). Edited by Grigori Mints, Valeria de Paiva and Ruy de Queiroz. Volume 207, Issue 10, Pages 969-1094, (October 2009).
 Annals of Pure and Applied Logic, 12th Workshop on Logic, Language, Information and Computation. Florianópolis, Santa Catarina, Brazil. 19–22 July 2005. Edited by R. de Queiroz and A. Macintyre. Volume 152, Issues 1-3, Pages 1–180 (March 2008).
 Theoretical Computer Science, Logic, Language, Information and Computation, 11th Workshop on Logic, Language, Information and Computation. Paris, France. 19–22 July 2004. Edited by R. de Queiroz and P. Cégielski. Volume 364, Issue 2, Pages 143-270 (6 November 2006).
 Theoretical Computer Science, Logic, Language, Information and Computation. Minas Gerais, Brazil. 29 July-1 August 2003. Edited by R. de Queiroz and D. Kozen. Volume 355, Issue 2, Pages 105-260 (11 April 2006).
 Annals of Pure and Applied Logic, Papers presented at the 9th Workshop on Logic, Language, Information and Computation (WoLLIC’2002). 30 July-2 August 2002. Edited by R. de Queiroz, B. Poizat and S. Artemov. Volume 134, Issue 1, Pages 1–93 (June 2005).
 Matemática Contemporânea. 8th Workshop on Logic, Language, Information and Computation - WoLLIC'2001. Universidade de Brasília, July -August 2001 - Brasília. Edited by John T. Baldwin, Ruy J. G. B. de Queiroz, Edward H. Haeusler. Volume 24, 2003.
 Logic Journal of the Interest Group in Pure and Applied Logics. 7th Workshop on Logic, Language, Information and Computation - WoLLIC 2000. Natal (State of Rio Grande do Norte), August 15–18, 2000. Edited by Ruy J. G. B. de Queiroz. Volume 9, Issue 6, 2001.
 Logic Journal of the Interest Group in Pure and Applied Logics. 6th Workshop on Logic, Language, Information and Computation - WoLLIC'99. Itatiaia National Park (State of Rio de Janeiro), May 25–28, 1999. Edited by Ruy J. G. B. de Queiroz. Volume 8, Issue 5, 2000.

References

External links 
 
 WoLLIC entry at DBLP.
 ASL Sponsorship.
 WoLLIC 2013 1-page Conference Report. The Bulletin of Symbolic Logic 20(2):266-267, June 2014.  (Published online: 26 June 2014).
 WoLLIC 2014 Conference Report. In Logic Journal of the Interest Group in Pure and Applied Logics, Oxford University Press, 2015.
 WoLLIC 2014 1-page Conference Report. The Bulletin of Symbolic Logic 21(2):241-242, June 2015. 
 WoLLIC 2015 Conference Report. In Logic Journal of the Interest Group in Pure and Applied Logics, Oxford University Press, 2016.
 WoLLIC 2015 1-page Conference Report. The Bulletin of Symbolic Logic 22(3):436-437, September 2016. 
 WoLLIC 2016 Conference Report. In Logic Journal of the Interest Group in Pure and Applied Logics, Oxford University Press, December 2016.
 WoLLIC 2016 1-page Conference Report. The Bulletin of Symbolic Logic 23(2):270-271, June 2017. 
 WoLLIC 2017 Conference Report. In Logic Journal of the Interest Group in Pure and Applied Logics, Oxford University Press, May 2018.
 WoLLIC 2017 1-page Conference Report. The Bulletin of Symbolic Logic  24(3):386–387, September 2018. 
 WoLLIC 2018 1-page Conference Report. The Bulletin of Symbolic Logic  24(4):548–549, December 2018. 
 WoLLIC 2018 Conference Report. In Logic Journal of the Interest Group in Pure and Applied Logics, Oxford University Press, Apr 2019.
 WoLLIC 2019 1-page Conference Report. The Bulletin of Symbolic Logic  25(3):421–422, September 2019. 
 WoLLIC 2019 Conference Report. In Logic Journal of the Interest Group in Pure and Applied Logics, Oxford University Press, June 2021.
 WoLLIC 2021 Conference Report. In Logic Journal of the Interest Group in Pure and Applied Logics, Oxford University Press, August 2022.

Theoretical computer science conferences
Recurring events established in 1994